Edward Melling (born 1900 – death unknown) was an English professional rugby league footballer who played in the 1910s and 1920s.

Background
Teddy Melling was born in Wigan, Lancashire, England.

Contemporaneous article extract
"E. Melling' Bradford (Northern Rugby league.) Born in Wigan in 1900, Edward Melling has proved himself a great utility player. His natural position is scrum half, but he can adapt himself to any position in the back division. He first played for Batley, but Bradford were keen to secure his services, and he went to them and has been one of the mainstays of the team. He has been the leading scorer in the last two seasons. In the season 1926-26 he missed only one out of 47  League and Cup matches"

References

External links
Search for "Melling" at rugbyleagueproject.org
Photograph "Teddy Melling - Teddy Melling played for Bradford Northern from 1920 until 1928 scoring 339 points in 286 games before being transferred to Broughton Rangers. - Date: 01/01/1920" at rlhp.co.uk
Photograph "Bradford Northern 1926/27 - This team finished next to bottom in the league with the worst defensive record in the league. - Date: 01/01/1927" at rlhp.co.uk
Photograph "Bradford Northern 1927/28 - One of the more successful of Bradford Northern's sides of the 1920s, this team finished sixteenth. They then had to sell Harold Young, Jack Cox, Teddy Melling and Stanley Brogden within the next two years and finished bottom of the league for the next f... - Date: 01/01/1928 - Players: Harold Young (back row, fourth left), Jack Cox (back row, sixth left), Teddy Melling (back row, extreme right), Stanley Brogden ( front row, second Left)." at rlhp.co.uk
Search for "Teddy Melling" at britishnewspaperarchive.co.uk

1900 births
Batley Bulldogs players
Bradford Bulls players
Broughton Rangers players
English rugby league players
Rugby league players from Wigan
Place of death missing
Rugby league halfbacks
Year of death missing